The 1983 PGA Championship was the 65th PGA Championship, held August 4–7 at Riviera Country Club in Los Angeles, California. Hal Sutton led wire-to-wire to win his only major title, one stroke ahead of runner-up Jack Nicklaus, a five-time champion. Nicklaus shot a final round 66 (−5) for his 19th and final runner-up finish in a major championship. Sutton was under scrutiny as he entered the weekend; two weeks earlier in Virginia, he had a six-shot lead after 54 holes, shot a final round 77, and finished third.

It was the second major at Riviera, following the U.S. Open in 1948, won by Ben Hogan.  The PGA Championship returned to the course in 1995, and it hosts a regular event on the PGA Tour, originally known as the Los Angeles Open.

Only the third PGA Championship in California, it was preceded by 1929 in Los Angeles at Hillcrest and 1977 at Pebble Beach. The 1962 event was originally awarded to Brentwood in L.A., but was moved to Philadelphia at Aronimink.

This was the first major championship to award a six-figure winner's share, $100,000, increasing from the $65,000 of the previous year. The first five-figure winner's share in a major was the 1958 Masters and the 2001 Masters was the first to break seven figures.

Round summaries

First round
Thursday, August 4, 1983

Source:

Second round
Friday, August 5, 1983

Source:

Third round
Saturday, August 6, 1983

Source:

Final round
Sunday, August 7, 1983

Final leaderboard

Source:

References

External links
PGA.com – 1983 PGA Championship 
Yahoo! Sports: 1983 PGA Championship leaderboard

PGA Championship
Golf in Los Angeles
PGA Championship
PGA Championship
PGA Championship
PGA Championship